McKinlay is an outback town and locality in McKinlay Shire, Queensland, Australia.

Geography 

The town is located slightly north of the centre of the locality. The Landsborough Highway enters the locality from the east (Kynuna), passes through the town along Kirby Street, and exits to the north-west (Kuridala / Cloncurry).

The McKinlay River enters the locality from the south-west (Selwyn), flows immediately north-west of the town, exiting the locality to the north (Julia Creek) where it becomes a tributary of the Gilliart River, ultimately becoming a tributary of the Flinders River which flows into the Gulf of Carpentaria.

History
McKinlay is named for the nearby McKinlay River—itself named for the Scottish explorer John McKinlay who was the first European to discover the river in 1861.

Gold was discovered in the area in 1872.

A letter receiving office was opened in 1883. Mackinlay Post Office opened on 1 April 1894 and was renamed McKinlay in 1909.

The town was surveyed and allotments sold in 1888.

Mackinlay State School opened on 5 July 1897. In 1934, the spelling of the name was changed to McKinlay State School. It closed in 1953 but reopened in January 1957. It closed permanently on 5 December 1986. It was on a  site bounded by Poole Street, Wylde Street, and Kirby Street. The school building remains on the site as a community facility; it faces Wylde Street.

The offices of the Shire of McKinlay were located in the town until 1930 when they were relocated to Julia Creek.

St Mary the Virgin's Anglican Church was officially opened and dedicated by Bishop John Feetham on Sunday 8 August 1937. The church building had been relocated from Kynuna where it had been previously used as a Roman Catholic church. It has now closed in McKinlay.

Our Lady of the Way Catholic Church was in Middleton Street. It opened in 1961, after being relocated from Julia Creek, where it had been St Abigail's Catholic Church. It has now closed in McKinlay.

Economy

Education
There are no schools in McKinlay.

Amenities

McKinlay has a park and a small museum.

The Crafty Old School House (the former McKinlay State School) in Wylde Street is used for community events and can hired for private events. The school's tennis courts are also available for use.

The McKinlay Shire Council operates a public library at Middleton Street; it is claimed to be Queensland's smallest public library. It also serves as the town's Visitor Information Centre.

The McKinlay branch of the Queensland Country Women's Association has its rooms at 22 Middleton Street.

Regular services by the Uniting Church in Australia are held in the QCWA rooms. These are provided by the  McKay Patrol, an aerial service of the Uniting Church in Australia that operates out of Cloncurry.

Attractions

The town is best known for the Walkabout Creek Hotel, featured in the movie Crocodile Dundee. The pub operates from the former McKinlay Shire Hall It has become a major tourism draw for the town and, when put up for sale in 2010, attracted worldwide interest.

References

External links

 Town map of Mckinlay, 1969

Towns in Queensland
1888 establishments in Australia
Populated places established in 1888
Shire of Mckinlay
Localities in Queensland